The Toyota Fine (Fuel cell INnovation Emotion) or FINE, is a series of concept cars from the Toyota Motor Corporation which use fuel cell technology.

Models
These models include:
 Toyota Fine-S (2003) FINE-Sport
 Toyota Fine-N (2003)
 Toyota Fine-X (2005) FINE-eXperiment
 Toyota Fine-T (2005)
 Toyota Fine-Comfort Ride Concept (2017)

See also
 Toyota concept vehicles
 List of Toyota vehicles
 Toyota FCHV Fuel Cell Hybrid Vehicle
 Toyota FCV Fuel Cell Vehicle
 Toyota Mirai Fuel cell production vehicle

References

FINE
FINE, Toyota